Roger Matthew Combes (born 12 June 1947) is a retired Archdeacon of Horsham.

Birth and education
Combes was educated at King's College London, and Ridley Hall, Cambridge.

Church career
He was ordained in 1974 and was a curate at St Paul's Onslow Square, Holy Trinity Brompton, and Holy Sepulchre with All Saints, Cambridge. He became Rector of Silverhill, East Sussex, in 1983 and was the Archdeacon of Horsham from 2003 until his retirement in 2014.

Personal life
In 1983 he married Christine Mary Keiller.

Notes

1947 births
Alumni of King's College London
Archdeacons of Horsham
Living people